The Shadow Ministry of Jodi McKay was the Labor opposition from July 2019 to May 2021, opposing the Berejiklian government in the Parliament of New South Wales. It was led by Jodi McKay following her election as leader of the party and NSW Leader of the Opposition on 29 June 2019. The shadow ministry was announced on 3 July 2019.

The shadow cabinet was made up of 31 members of the NSW Labor caucus. 3 of the shadow ministers quit the shadow ministry in May 2021, culminating in the resignation of McKay as Leader of the Opposition on 28 May 2021. One of the shadow ministers who quit, Chris Minns, became the new Leader of the Opposition the following week, and the McKay shadow ministry was replaced by the Minns shadow ministry.

Shadow Cabinet

See also

2019 New South Wales state election
Second Berejiklian ministry
Shadow Ministry of Michael Daley
Shadow Ministry of Chris Minns

References

McKay